Chiu Chuang-huan (25 July 1925 – 2 July 2020) was a Taiwanese politician. He was the Vice Premier from 1981 to 1984.

Born in Changhua, Chiu was of Hakka ancestry from Raoping, Chaozhou, Guangdong, China.

Chiu died on 2 July 2020, aged 94.

See also
 List of vice premiers of the Republic of China

References

1925 births
2020 deaths
National Chengchi University alumni
Politicians of the Republic of China on Taiwan from Changhua County
Taiwanese Ministers of the Interior
Taiwanese Presidents of the Examination Yuan
Taiwanese politicians of Hakka descent
Taiwanese people of Hakka descent
Yeungnam University alumni